is a railway station on the Myōkō Haneuma Line in the city of Myōkō, Niigata, Japan, operated by the third-sector operator Echigo Tokimeki Railway.

Lines

Station layout
The station has a single ground-level side platform serving a bi-directional track. The station is unattended.

Adjacent stations

History

Kita-Arai Station was opened on 15 July 1955. With the privatization of Japanese National Railways (JNR) on 1 April 1987, the station came under the control of JR East.

From this date, Kita-Arai Station was transferred to the ownership of the third-sector operating company Echigo Tokimeki Railway.

Passenger statistics
In fiscal 2017, the station was used by an average of 256 passengers daily (boarding passengers only).

Surrounding area

See also
 List of railway stations in Japan

References

External links

 Echigo Tokimeki Railway Station information 
 Timetable for Kita-Arai Station 

Railway stations in Niigata Prefecture
Railway stations in Japan opened in 1955
Stations of Echigo Tokimeki Railway
Myōkō, Niigata